This is a list of mayors of Geneva, Switzerland. The office of mayor of Geneva (maire de Genève) rotates annually among the five members of the Conseil administratif, the executive government of the city. The new mayor takes office in June.

Between 1842 and 1954, the title of the person presiding the executive of the City of Geneva was Président du Conseil administratif; since 1954, the title Maire (mayor) is used.

Numbers in brackets after names indicate the ordinal of the term, e.g. (2) indicates that individual's second term as mayor.

External links

City of Geneva: The composition of the Executive Council
Maires de la Ville de Genève depuis 1842 (PDF version)

Geneva
Geneva-related lists